Moonwalk may refer to:

Space travel
 Moonwalk, an excursion on the Moon, see Moon landing
 For a specific event, see List of spacewalks and moonwalks 1965–1999
 For a specific person, see List of people who have walked on the Moon
Extravehicular activity on the moon

Places
 Moon Walk (New Orleans), a scenic boardwalk in Jackson Square
 Moonwalk, Parañaque, one of the 16 Barangays in Parañaque, Philippines

Arts, entertainment, and media
 Moonwalk (album), a 2011 album by JPM
 Moonwalk (book), a 1988 autobiography by Michael Jackson
 Moonwalk (dance), a dance move popularized by Michael Jackson
 "Moonwalkin", a song by Roddy Ricch from Please Excuse Me for Being Antisocial
"Moonwalk", a song by Earth, Wind & Fire from the album Electric Universe
"Moonwalk", a song by WayV from the album Take Over The Moon

Other uses
 Moonwalk (bounce house) or inflatable castle, a temporary inflatable structure used for entertainment
 MoonWalk (charity event), an annual nocturnal marathon in London and Edinburgh
 Moonwalk (cocktail), a drink invented for the first walk on the Moon in 1969

See also
 A Walk on the Moon, a 1999 film
 Moonwalk One, a 1970 motion picture about the flight of Apollo 11
 Moonwalker, a 1988 motion picture starring Michael Jackson
 Michael Jackson's Moonwalker, a 1990 video game based on the movie
 Walk the Moon, a U.S. rock band
 Walk the Moon (album), by Walk the Moon
 "Walkin' on the Moon", a 2009 song by The-Dream
 "Walking on the Moon", a 1979 song by The Police